Lakarabad may refer to:
 Lakarabad-e Olya
 Lakarabad-e Sofla